Pucciniastrum is a genus of Basidiomycota fungi. Pucciniastrum species, like all rust fungi, are obligate plant parasites.

The genus name of Pucciniastrum is in honour of Tommaso Puccini (died 1735), who was an Italian doctor and botanist who taught Anatomy at Hospital of Santa Maria Nuova in Florence. 

The genus was circumscribed by Gustav Heinrich Otth in Mitt. Naturf. Ges. Bern 476-479: 61, 71-75, 80-81, 84,
87 in 1861.

Species 
As accepted by Species Fungorum; 

 Pucciniastrum aceris 
 Pucciniastrum actinidiae 
 Pucciniastrum agrimoniae 
 Pucciniastrum alaskanum 
 Pucciniastrum areolatum 
 Pucciniastrum asterum 
 Pucciniastrum beringianum 
 Pucciniastrum boehmeriae 
 Pucciniastrum brachybotrydis 
 Pucciniastrum castaneae 
 Pucciniastrum celastri 
 Pucciniastrum circaeae 
 Pucciniastrum clemensiae 
 Pucciniastrum corchoropsidis 
 Pucciniastrum coriariae 
 Pucciniastrum corni 
 Pucciniastrum coronisporum 
 Pucciniastrum coryli 
 Pucciniastrum crawfurdiae 
 Pucciniastrum crawfurdiae-japonicae 
 Pucciniastrum enkianthi  
 Pucciniastrum epilobii 
 Pucciniastrum epilobii-dodonaei 
 Pucciniastrum fagi 
 Pucciniastrum fuchsiae 
 Pucciniastrum gaultheriae 
 Pucciniastrum gentianae 
 Pucciniastrum goodyerae 
 Pucciniastrum guttatum 
 Pucciniastrum hakkodense 
 Pucciniastrum hikosanense  
 Pucciniastrum hydrangeae 
 Pucciniastrum hydrangeae-petiolaris 
 Pucciniastrum ishikariense 
 Pucciniastrum ishiuchii 
 Pucciniastrum kusanoi 
 Pucciniastrum magnisporum 
 Pucciniastrum malloti 
 Pucciniastrum menziesiae 
 Pucciniastrum mussaendae 
 Pucciniastrum myosotidii 
 Pucciniastrum nipponicum 
 Pucciniastrum pseudocerasi 
 Pucciniastrum pyrolae 
 Pucciniastrum rubiae 
 Pucciniastrum sparsum 
 Pucciniastrum stachyuri 
 Pucciniastrum symphyti 
 Pucciniastrum tripetaleiae 
 Pucciniastrum verruculosum 
 Pucciniastrum wikstroemiae 
 Pucciniastrum yoshinagae

References

External links 
 Index Fungorum
 

Basidiomycota genera
Fungal plant pathogens and diseases
Pucciniales